Hull Property Group is a shopping mall management company based in Augusta, Georgia. It was founded in 1977. The company owns, manages, and re-develops shopping malls in relatively small communities, mainly in the south and mid-west United States.

History
The company was founded in 1977 as Hull Properties, renamed Hull/Storey in 1993, and became Hull Storey Gibson in 2008.

Among its acquisitions are Regency Square Mall in Florence, Alabama, in 2002, and Victoria Mall in Victoria, Texas in 2003.

In 2007, Hull Storey offered eleven of its properties for sale. These malls were located in Alabama, Georgia, North Carolina, South Carolina, and Tennessee. The malls were to have been sold to Hendon Properties, but the deal failed in early 2008.

Hull Storey Gibson also bought Macon Mall of Macon, Georgia in 2010 and began renovations on it. Danville Mall, formerly Piedmont Mall, was bought in 2013.

In September 2014, the company was restructured with the mall retail arm being renamed Hull Property Group.

In January 2017, Hull Property Group purchased the Hudson Valley Mall in the upper Hudson Valley region of New York state.

In January 2020, Hull Property Group purchased The Mall at Whitney Field, in Leominster, Massachusetts.

In May 2021, Hull Property Group announced that it will purchase the Charleston Town Center Mall in Charleston, West Virginia.

List of properties
Mall properties managed by Hull Property Group include:

References

External links
Official website

 
Real estate companies established in 1977
Companies based in Augusta, Georgia
Shopping center management firms
1977 establishments in Georgia (U.S. state)